It's All Over but the Swingin is a 1957 album by Sammy Davis Jr., arranged by Jack Pleis and Morty Stevens.

Track listing
 "Guess I'll Hang My Tears out to Dry" (Sammy Cahn, Jule Styne) – 4:43
 "But Not for Me" (George Gershwin, Ira Gershwin) – 3:24
 "Where's That Rainbow?" (Lorenz Hart, Richard Rodgers) – 3:27
 "I Cover the Waterfront" (Johnny Green, Edward Heyman) – 3:19
 "Don't Blame Me" (Dorothy Fields, Jimmy McHugh) – 2:52
 "Better Luck Next Time" (Irving Berlin) – 2:43
 "Can't Help Lovin' Dat Gal" (Oscar Hammerstein II, Jerome Kern) – 4:53
 "It Never Entered My Mind" (Hart, Rodgers) – 4:05
 "Someone to Watch over Me" (G. Gershwin, I. Gershwin) – 3:23
 "I've Grown Accustomed to Her Face" (Alan Jay Lerner, Frederick Loewe) – 2:47
 "Spring Is Here" (Hart, Rodgers) – 4:03
 "I Can't Get Started" (Vernon Duke, I. Gershwin) – 3:29

Personnel

Performance
Sammy Davis Jr. – vocal
Dan Lube, M. Sosson - violin
Al Dinkin, Paul Robyn - viola
Eleanor Slatkin - cello
Harry Klee - flute
Harry Edison, Conrad Gozzo, Virgil Evans, Mannie Klein - trumpet
Milt Bernhart, Frank Howard, George Roberts - trombone
Harry Klein, Ronnie Lang - alto saxophone
Babe Russin, Don Raffell - tenor saxophone
Bob Lawson - baritone saxophone
Roger Renner - piano
Tony Rizzi, Bob Bain - guitar
Mort Cobb, Joe Comfort - double bass
Irving Cottler, Alvin Stoller - drums
Personnel as listed in the liner notes.

References

1957 albums
Albums arranged by Jack Pleis
Sammy Davis Jr. albums
Decca Records albums